Hair curler may refer to:

 a hair roller
 a hair iron